Ernest King (1878–1956) was a U.S. Navy Fleet Admiral. Admiral King may also refer to:

Clyde King (rower) (1898–1982), U.S. Navy rear admiral
Edward Durnford King (1771–1862), British Royal Navy admiral
George King (Royal Navy officer) (1809–1891), British Royal Navy admiral
Norman King (Royal Navy officer) (1933–2013), British Royal Navy vice admiral
Phillip Parker King (1791–1856), British Royal Navy rear admiral
Sir Richard King, 1st Baronet (1730–1806), British Royal Navy admiral
Sir Richard King, 2nd Baronet (1774–1834), British Royal Navy vice admiral

See also
Admiral King-Hall (disambiguation)